Pig Sty is an American sitcom that aired on UPN during the network's first season. The series premiered on January 23, 1995, ran on Monday nights, after Star Trek: Voyager and Platypus Man, and was cancelled after 13 episodes on May 15, 1995. Pig Sty was produced by Paramount Network Television.

Premise
The show was about five male roommates sharing an apartment in New York City, and their female superintendent.

Cast 
 Brian McNamara as Randy Fitzgerald – Randy was a struggling writer who supported himself by tending bar. He was often frustrated by his inability to sell a single story. Randy also had an unrequited crush on the building's superintendent, Tess.
 Matthew Borlenghi as Johnny Barzano – Johnny was a young assistant district attorney. In the pilot, Johnny was engaged and moving out, forcing the others to find a fourth person to split the rent with.  However, Johnny decided that his fiancée was too "clingy," called off the engagement, and tried to move back into the apartment. It was Randy who came up with the plan that would enable five guys to share a two-bedroom apartment.
 Timothy Fall as P.J. Morris – P.J. wanted to be a songwriter, however, he never sold any of his songs and, in fact, lived off a large trust fund. P.J. was often ridiculed by Randy for being a "trust fund baby". Every few months he would have dinner with his father to discuss his going into the family business, but P.J. always refused. His family obtained its wealth from the tobacco industry, thus P.J.'s name can be seen as a pun on the Philip J. Morris Company.
 David Arnott as Cal Evans – Cal was an unscrupulous advertising executive. He was known for having slovenly personal habits and for his love of smoking cigars. When Johnny tried to move back in, the other roommates initially tried to force out Cal because of his bad habits. However, Cal revealed that he had secretly put his name on the lease to prevent them from kicking him out. So instead, the group decided that Cal should move into the walk-in closet with P.J.'s dog. Cal graduated from college with a 1.0 GPA. He claimed that his favorite holidays were New Year's Day and St. Patrick's Day, because he liked to get girls really drunk so that they would have pity sex with him.
 Sean O'Bryan as Joe "Iowa" Dantley – Joe was a doctor and a transplanted Iowan starting his residency at a New York hospital. He was only called Joe in the pilot episode; afterwards the guys all referred to him by the nickname "Iowa."  He was originally supposed to be the fourth roommate when Johnny moved out.  However, when Johnny wanted to come back a deal had to be reached to accommodate the situation.
 Liz Vassey as Tess Gallaway – Tess was a struggling actress who worked as the building superintendent while waiting for her acting career to take off. Randy would regularly break things in the apartment so that Tess would have to come up and repair them. In one episode Randy got Iowa to take some lab mice from the hospital, forcing Tess to come and catch them; all in a futile attempt to spend more time with Tess. Although she was aware of Randy's crush on her, and that he was deliberately breaking objects, Tess did not return his affections. She believed that Randy was too immature for a serious relationship.

Episodes

References

Original broadcasts of Pig Sty, 1995, UPN.

External links 

1990s American sitcoms
1995 American television series debuts
1995 American television series endings
UPN original programming
English-language television shows
Television series by CBS Studios
Television shows set in New York City